Fazila Aliani (born 1945) is a veteran politician, women's rights activist and educationist from Balochistan, Pakistan. She was the first woman minister of Balochistan when she was appointed Minister of Health, Education and Social Welfare in 1976. She was also the first woman elected to the Balochistan Assembly in 1972.

Positions held
 1972-1977: Member Provincial Assembly Baluchistan
 1976: Provincial Minister of Health, Education and Social Welfare, Balochistan
 1980-1984: Member Provincial Council Baluchistan
 1985-1988: Member Provincial Assembly Baluchistan
 Member, Federal Public Service Commission, Islamabad.
 Member, National Commission of Human Rights, Government of Pakistan

See also
 Fazila

References

External links
 Opening Doors for Girls in Balochistan Province of Pakistan

1945 births
Living people
Jamote people
People from Balochistan, Pakistan
20th-century Pakistani women politicians